Patrick Jacobs (born 25 July 1962) is a former Belgian racing cyclist. He rode in four editions of the Tour de France between 1987 and 1991.

References

External links

1962 births
Living people
Belgian male cyclists
People from Halle, Belgium
Cyclists from Flemish Brabant